Max Baginski (1864 – November 24, 1943) was a German-American anarchist revolutionary.

Early life
Baginski was born in 1864 in Bartenstein (now Bartoszyce), a small East Prussian town. His father was a shoemaker who had been active in the 1848 revolution and was thus shunned by the conservative inhabitants of the village. Under his father's influence, Baginski read freethinker August Specht's writings and Berliner Freie Presse, Johann Most's newspaper, in his youth. After school Baginski became his father's apprentice.

Already a staunch socialist, Baginski moved to Berlin in 1882. He emigrated to the U.S. in 1893.

Professional career
From 1894 to 1901, he was an editor of the Chicago Worker newspaper. He helped publishing the 1906–07 issues of the magazine Freedom and editorials for the anarchist magazine Mother Earth in New York City.
This is a quote from the first issue of Mother Earth Magazine.

Death
Baginski died at Bellevue Hospital in New York on November 24, 1943.

Works
1906: Mother Earth 
November, 1907: The Anarchist International
1907: Stirner: The Ego and His Own
1907: Anarchy and Organization: The Debate at the 1907 International Anarchist Congress
January, 1912: The Right To Live

See also
American philosophy
List of American philosophers

References

External links
 Max Baginski Page from the Daily Bleed's Anarchist Encyclopedia
 A brief description of Baginski's life
 Max Baginski, The right to live
 

1864 births
1943 deaths
20th-century American philosophers
20th-century German philosophers
American anarchists
American male non-fiction writers
American political philosophers
American political writers
American revolutionaries
Anarchist writers
Anarcho-communists
German anarchists
German emigrants to the United States
German male non-fiction writers
German political philosophers
German political writers
German revolutionaries
People from Bartoszyce
People from the Province of Prussia
Philosophy writers